Bruno Bartolozzi (8 June 1911 – 12 December 1980) was an Italian composer and pioneer in the development of extended techniques for wind instruments.

He was born in Florence.

Selected works

Concerti with orchestra 
 Concerto for orchestra
 Concerto for violin, string orchestra and harpsichord
 Concerto No. 2 for violin and orchestra
 Memorie for three guitars and orchestra

Vocal music 
 Sentimento del sogno for soprano and orchestra
 Immagine for soprano and 17 executors
 Tres requerdos del cielo for bass and various instruments

Chamber music 
 Tre pezzi for guitar
 Serenata for violin and guitar
 Musica a cinque for violin, viola, trombone, bassoon and guitar
 Variazioni for solo violin
 Due studi for violin
 Andamenti for viola
 Cantilena for flute in G
 Collage for solo oboe
 Collage for solo bassoon
 Sinaudolodia for four flutes
 The Hollow Man for wind instruments
 Omaggio a Gaetano Azzolina for guitar
 Musica per Piero for two violas
 Auser for oboe and guitar
 Collage for solo clarinet
 Repitu flute, viola, guitar and percussion
 Madrigale di Gesualdo for accordion
 Per Olga for solo flute
 Adles for guitar
 The Solitary for oboe and percussion
 Atma for three groups of solo instruments
 Risonanze for 18 instruments
 String Quartet No. 1
 String Quartet No. 2

Concertazioni 
The series of Concertazioni includes:
 Concertazioni for bassoon, strings and percussion
 Concertazioni for oboe and other instruments
 Concertazioni a quattro for flute, oboe, clarinet and bassoon
 Concertazioni for B-flat clarinet and other instruments

Piano music 
 Estri del Fa Diesis for piano

Stage works 
 Tutto ciò che accade ti riguarda

Methods and didactic works 
 New sounds for Woodwinds. London: Oxford University Press.
 Nuovi suoni per i legni. Milan: Edizioni Suvini Zerboni.
 Metodo per oboe (with Lawrence Singer). Milan: Edizioni Suvini Zerboni.
 Metodo per clarinetto (with Giuseppe Garbarino). Milan: Edizioni Suvini Zerboni.
 Metodo per fagotto (with Sergio Penazzi). Milan: Edizioni Suvini Zerboni.
 Metodo per flauto (with Pierluigi Mencarelli). Milan: Edizioni Suvini Zerboni.

References

Further reading 
 

1911 births
1980 deaths
20th-century classical composers
Italian classical composers
Italian male classical composers
20th-century Italian composers
20th-century Italian male musicians